Burkard Polster (born 26 February 1965 in Würzburg) is a German mathematician who runs and presents the Mathologer channel on YouTube.

Polster earned a doctorate from the University of Erlangen–Nuremberg in 1993 under the supervision of Karl Strambach.
He works as an associate professor of mathematics at Monash University in Melbourne, Australia. Other universities that Polster has been affiliated with, before joining Monash in 2000, include the University of Würzburg, University at Albany, University of Kiel, University of California, Berkeley,
University of Canterbury, and University of Adelaide.

Polster's research involves topics in geometry, recreational mathematics, and the mathematics of everyday life, including how to tie shoelaces or stabilize a wobbly table.

Books
Polster is the author of multiple books including:
 
 
 
  Included in the four-book compilation Scientia: Mathematics, Physics, Chemistry, Biology, and Astronomy for All (2011) and translated into German as Sciencia: Mathematik, Physik, Chemie, Biologie und Astronomie für alle verständlich (Librero, 2014, in German).

References

External links
Mathologer, Polster's YouTube site
Maths Masters, Burkard Polster and Marty Ross

Australian mathematicians
20th-century German mathematicians
Recreational mathematicians
University of Erlangen-Nuremberg alumni
Academic staff of Monash University
Living people
Science-related YouTube channels
1965 births
Mathematics popularizers
21st-century German mathematicians
English-language YouTube channels